Ilex khasiana is a species of plant in the family Aquifoliaceae. It is endemic to Meghalaya state in northeast India. Four very rare specimens grow on Shillong Peak, 10 km west of Shillong, Meghalaya.

References

khasiana
Flora of Meghalaya
Taxonomy articles created by Polbot